Mit Leib und Seele is the fifth album released by Schandmaul on 31 March 2006. It remained in the German Longplay Charts for ten weeks, peaking at #10.

Reviews
The Austrian webzine Stormbringer wrote a positive review, stating that although not overly innovative, the album was well-made and stirring with enough clearance given to the various instruments to unfold their character. The Sonic Seducer magazine of Germany called it the most diverse Schandmaul album so far and lauded the great range of sentiments on Mit Leib und Seele.

Track listing

Personnel
 Thomas Lindner – vocals, acoustic guitar, accordion
 Birgit Muggenthaler-Schmack – flutes, shawms, bagpipe, vocals
 Martin "Ducky" Duckstein – electric guitar, acoustic guitar, classical guitar, vocals
 Stefan Brunner – drums, percussion, vocals
 Matthias Richter – bass, upright bass 
 Anna Kränzlein – violin, hurdy-gurdy, vocals
 Astrid Neagele - cello on 4, 8, 9, 17

References

2006 albums
Schandmaul albums